Lake Mitococha or Mitucocha (possibly from Quechua mit'u, mitu mud, qucha lake, "mud lake") is a lake in Peru located in Huanuco Region, Lauricocha Province, Queropalca District. It lies on the east side of the Huayhuash mountain range, northeast of Mituraju and Rondoy. Lake Mitococha is 0.83 km long and 0.3 km at its widest point.

See also
Ninacocha
List of lakes in Peru

References

Lakes of Peru
Lakes of Huánuco Region